The Marylebone Cricket Club tour of Australia in 1946-47 under the captaincy of Wally Hammond was its ninth since it took official control of overseas tours in 1903-1904 and the first since the Second World War. The touring team played as England in the 1946–47 Ashes series against Australia, but as the MCC in all other games. In all there were 25 matches; 5 Test matches (which they lost 3-0), 13 other First Class matches (which they won 1-0) and 7 minor matches (which they won 3-0). Australia had been suffering a drought since 1937, but this ended as it rained in every match the MCC played on tour, including tropical thunderstorms twice in Brisbane and again in Sydney. However, this had an adverse effect on the pitches and denied the touring team adequate practice and lead to many draws.

Hammond's ill-equipped army returned to England beaten, yet deserving of the highest honours for their sportsmanship, their ability to smile in the face of certain disaster and also for their success in gaining the objective of their invasion - the spreading of cricket goodwill from the Homeland to a Dominion.
Clif Cary

Traveling to Australia
The Stirling Castle was still under the control of War Transport and was equipped more or less as a troopship - no luxury cabins as the case for the team now. Laurie Fishlock and I shared a cabin so small that we could hardly turn round. The ship was 'dry' and on board were some 700 war brides returning to Australia.
The MCC team left austerity Britain on 31 August 1946 on the SS Stirling Castle and sailed to Australia, arriving in Perth, Western Australia in September 1946, three weeks before their first scheduled match. They used this time to acclimatise and practice in the nets, but also to put on weight. Having arrived from a country that had had seven years of rationing Australia was a 'land flowing with milk and honey' and Hammond promised his men "the happiest six months of their lives". Everyone in the team put on weight, one "consuming more in one day in Perth than his full weekly ration in London" and the big bowlers Bill Voce and Dick Pollard adding up to two stone (28 lbs) in weight.  The team sent home food parcels from each city they visited and in general took an easy time of it. A Saturday Night Club was organised in which the team would don bow-ties in MCC colours and sit down to a full dinner together. Aware that this would affect their mobility in the field physical training was organised, but it was not kept up. In general the atmosphere was that of a holiday, with the feeling that this was a goodwill tour to re-establish cricketing relations ten years after the last tour of Australia, and that a serious cricket would not begin until the 1948 Ashes series. The English and Australian press praised them for their sporting attitude and dwelt on the batting prowess of Wally Hammond, Len Hutton, Denis Compton and the bowling abilities of Alec Bedser and Doug Wright.

Northam and Country Districts vs MCC

A major part of the MCC tour was to fly the flag, promote cricket throughout Australia and earn revenue for the English counties. All these were fulfilled by playing upcountry games against local grade cricket teams and as these sides were roughly the equivalent to Lancashire League they provided the tourists with valuable practice before taking on the state sides and Australia. Northam was a small mining town 60 miles inland from Perth, but the mine was played out and the local economy was geared to sheep-raising. After regaining their land legs from their voyage the team travelled up. It had been 10 years since the MCC had toured Australia in 1936-37, the town was decorated as if for a fête and the players were entertained by the locals. The Northam captain won the toss and batted, but his team was soon out as big left-arm fast bowler Bill Voce of Bodyline fame took 3/11 and Peter Smith 5/55 with his leg-spin. The opener Tetlaw top-scored with 34 and added 44 for the fifth wicket with Lawrence (32). Slater made 26 batting at number 7, but no one else reached double figures and they were out for 123. Len Hutton (51) and Cyril Washbrook (47) added 93 for the first wicket, then Denis Compton hit 84 with 11 fours and Wally Hammond 131 with 19 fours and 4 sixes before he 'retired out' and declared the innings at 409/6 after tea the next day. This proved sufficient to bowl out the Northam team for 71, Tetlaw (29) again top-scored, but Bill Edrich added figures of 6/20 to his three first innings catches and 38 not out. Smith took 4/18 and the MCC won by an innings and 215 runs inside two days.

Western Australia Colts vs MCC

After the game at Northam the MCC preceded to Perth where Yardley led them in a one-day game against the Western Australian Colts, mostly 20-year-olds trying to get into the Western Australian team. The Colts won the toss and put the MCC into bat. Cyril Washbrook made 25 before he was lbw to William Alderman, the father of Terry Alderman. The wicketkeeper Paul Gibb opened with Washbrook as Hammond wanted him to bat at number three in the Tests and made 51, adding 63 for the first wicket. Laurie Fishlock (50) and Norman Yardley (31 not out) added 73 for the fourth wicket and the MCC declared at 197/4. Dick Pollard and Bill Voce had the Colts 7/2, but they recovered, with Wally Langdon making 48 and though wickets fell steadily they survived the day on 138/6.

Western Australia vs MCC

Although they would win the 1947–48 Sheffield Shield Western Australia were its weakest team (Tasmania was not yet included) and isolated from the rest of Australia, so they provided an easy start for the MCC's round of state matches. The WACA Ground would not see a Test match until the 1970-71 Ashes series. George Robinson won the toss for the home side and batted. Herbert Rigg (34) and Allan Edwards (43) made their first class debuts and added 76 for the first wicket. David Watt (85) and Morgan Herbet (53) made 118 for the fifth wicket as Peter Smith (4/132) and Doug Wright (4/55) trundled their way through the batting order. Bill Voce (2/75) picked up a couple of late wickets and Western Australia were out for 366 on the second morning. Gibb and Washbrook opened again, but it was Jack Ikin (66) and Joe Hardstaff (53) who made the early runs, followed by Wally Hammond's 208. This was Hammond's 36th double hundred, overtaking Don Bradman's record and this early indication of good form gave the Australians some worries (Bradman retook the record in 1947-48). He added 71 with Norman Yardley (31) and 149 with Smith (46) as the MCC made 477 in 478 minutes. Due to the rain this only left 46 minutes for the WA second innings and they made a safe 48/1. 19,500 people watched the game with £1,809 in receipts.

Western Australia Combined XI vs MCC

...the captain was sarcastic about Denis's 'capering about' outside his crease and rubbed in the point by turning to Jack Ikin and commending him for sticking in his ground. 'Let the ball come to you, that's the way to play out here.' Denis, from whom I had the story, was much deflated - he was, in fact, stumped for 98...The oracle was listened to with great respect, and his dictum was largely taken up by those who followed him in the England XIs - especially by Hutton, who was a fine enough technician to play slow bowling without coming out to meet it. To the ordinary mortal it is fatal to so surrender the initiative to slow bowling.
E.W. Swanton
To help Western Australia play the MCC on more even terms, and show some Australian talent to the Perth crowd Sid Barnes of New South Wales, Ken Meuleman and Ian Johnson of Victoria and Bruce Dooland of South Australia were sent over to make up a Combined XI. Robinson won the toss again and they made 462 with David Watt making 157. Barnes and Allan Edwards both made 45 and Johnson 87. The MCC bowling looked plain, but Jack Ikin's leg-spin was tested with old fashioned figures of 4/172. From this Hammond concluded that he wasn't a true all-rounder and thereafter used him in the minor games and rarely in the Tests. Every MCC match of the tour was rain-affected and the game finished when the tourists completed their first innings of 308. Cyril Washbrook (80) and Denis Compton (98) added 123 against the spin of Johnson (3/76) and Dooland (4/88) which they were seeing for the first time; "It was amazing to see Compton occasionally run down the pitch, change his mind, and either play the ball like a baseball bunt, or scamper back to ground his bat in time to get the benefit of the doubt on a stumping appeal". Hammond was scathing of Compton's habit of walking down the wicket to the slow bowlers and his instructions to his batsmen to stay within the crease to the spinners made them play as if nailed to the wicket in the Tests with dire consequences. In fairness Hammond had made many runs in Australia that way, but in 1928-29 when Australia had no decent spinners and Australians themselves are brought up to use their feet against the slow men. 24,500 came to watch the match with receipts of £1,832.

South Australia Country vs MCC

With Norman Yardley as captain the MCC were taken by train (complete with cow-catcher) to South Australia and "a town of rudimentary graces (at least in those days) called Port Pirie where the opposition was terribly bad and very few people even came to watch". Len Hutton (164), Laurie Fishlock (98), Denis Compton (100 in 67 minutes) and Joe Hardstaff (67 not out) helped themselves to runs in the MCC's 487/6 declared. The Country openers C.V. Wright (32) and J.A.J. Horsell (27) initially held up the bowlers, but once out the remaining wickets were scooped up by Peter Smith (5/16) and Doug Wright (5/40) as they collapsed to 87 all out. Following on C.V. Wright (25) and G.F. Tuck (30) made another stand after Horsell was out for a duck, but they were all out for 92. Only the spinners were used this time Wright (3/38), Smith (3/27) and James Langridge (4/17) in a victory by an innings and 308 runs.

South Australia vs MCC

The game against South Australia caused much interest as Don Bradman played his first match of the season after almost a year without top flight cricket and speculation about his health. Alec Bedser sat in the stands with Bradman's son John, but Hammond won the toss and chose to bat. After the warning not to caper about the wicket at Perth Len Hutton (136) and Cyril Washbrook (113) spent five hours adding 235 runs for the first wicket with "the eternal pushing of half-volleys and the gentle nudging of longhops from noon to dark". Against a fairly toothless attack in which Bruce Dooland was the best bowler with 3/146 Bill Edrich and Denis Compton both made 71 in a stand of 111 and Norman Yardley (54 not out) and Jack Ikin (35 not out) took the score to 506/5 before the declaration at the close of the second day. Bradman came in at 26/2 and after he was dropped by Godfrey Evans played a careful innings of 76. He added 83 with Phil Ridings (57) and 90 with Ron James (58) before he was caught and bowled by Peter Smith (5/93). The tail collapsed from 199/3 to 262/9 at stumps with James Langridge taking 3/60 and Hammond enforced the follow on when they were dismissed for 266. Reginald Craig made 111 and Bradman only 3, but John Mann helped save the day with 62 not out, adding 92 with Craig and 42 runs with Geff Noblet (25 not out). South Australia avoided an innings defeat with 276/8 and the game was drawn. 42,144 attended with receipts of £3,194.

Victoria vs MCC

Lindsay Hassett's Victoria was a tougher proposition, and they would win the Sheffield Shield for the 17th time that season. Yardley won the toss and batted, but they struggled against an attack of near Test strength; Bill Johnston, Fred Freer, Ian Johnson, George Tribe and Doug Ring. Washbrook was out for a duck, Gibb 22 and Hutton and Hardstaff 15 each, but Denis Compton made 143, added 119 with Norman Yardley (70), then carried on batting with the tail. The Victorian bowlers shared the wickets and the MCC were out for 358 early on the second morning. Before stumps Victoria were out for 189 thanks to Bill Voce (3/48) and Doug Wright (6/48). Hassett top scored with a stonewalling 57 until he went to Jack Ikin (1/18) and Yardley sent in his batsmen at the end of the day rather than enforce the follow on. Nobody made more than 21 except for Len Hutton with 151 not out "He defended superbly against balls which jumped alarmingly or spun viciously across the wicket, and flayed all that was loose". Johnson took 4/38 and Yardley declared on 279/7, leaving Victoria 449 to win on a dusty pitch. Hassett scored 57 again as did Merv Harvey, but Wright took 4/73 to give him 10 wickets in the match, Alec Bedser took 3/40 and Hutton bowled the opener Gordon Tamblyn with his leg-spin. Victoria were out for 204 runs and the MCC won by 224 runs - their only first class victory of the tour. They were helped by the pitch not having fully recovered from the Aussie Rules football season, even though they dropped catches innumerable. 64,322 attended with receipts of £6,176

Australian XI vs MCC

The Australia XI match was used by Australian selectors to see up and coming cricketers in action before choosing a team. It was Sydney's turn to host two Tests this series, so the match was held in Melbourne as a virtual Test match, though losing the first and fourth days of play to rain dampened the game somewhat. Usually the Australian vice-captain took control, but Bradman needed match practice and took command with Hassett alongside. Many potential Test players were also included; Merv Harvey, Arthur Morris, Keith Miller, Colin McCool, Ron Saggers and Fred Freer. Hammond was back in charge and batted after winning the toss. Hutton (71) and Washbrook (57) made an opening stand of 122, but only Hammond (51) passed 30 of the other batsmen and they were out for 314. McCool (7/106) dismissed Hutton, Washbrook, Edrich, Compton, Hammond, Yardley and Voce with his flighted wrist spin and "the English batsmen seemed like rabbits fascinated in the presence of a snake". The Australian XI opened with Harvey and Morris, who added 39 before Bradman came in. The Don made 106, Morris 115, they added 196 together and the Australian XI made 327/5 before rain ruined the final day. 84,336 attended (receipts unknown).

New South Wales vs MCC

Another rain-soaked match was played at Sydney. Hammond and Howard went to visit Sammy Carter, the wicketkeeper of Warwick Armstrong's Australian teams of 1920-21 and 1921 who won 8 Tests in a row, but was now confined to a wheelchair. He had donated £1,000 to the restoration of the Old Trafford cricket ground which had been bombed during the war and they wished to give him their personal thanks. Hammond won the toss and fielded, seeing Arthur Morris make an unbeaten 53 in their 99/4 in the time allowed in between the showers. The second and third days were rained off completely and Morris took his score to 81 not out when Sid Barnes declared. Hutton made a flawless 97 before he was run out after two hours and the MCC ended with 156/2. 22,733 attended with receipts of £2,320

Queensland vs MCC

People who were praying for water were among those to give the tourists a tremendous Brisbane welcome. Rain had fallen in every match in which the Englishmen had played and the record was maintained until the end of the tour...
Clif Cary
In the last match before the First Test the Queensland captain Don Tallon won the toss and batted. Rex Rogers (66) and Geoff Cook (who carried his bat for 169) put on 111 for the first wicket and Allan Young made 53, but no one else made 30 and they were out for 400. Norman Yardley, barely recognised as a change bowler by Yorkshire, took 3/19; "It was always amusing to watch the Englishmen when Yardley took a wicket. The first time he succeeded they seemed faintly amused, but when he was regularly breaking partnerships their enthusiasm knew no bounds..." The MCC made a pedestrian reply with 9 batsmen getting into double figures, but only two passing 50. Hutton (42) and Washbrook (40) made 65 together, Denis Compton 55 and Bill Edrich 64 not out. Ian Johnson opened the bowling with 4/53 and Colin McCool took 6/105 (Hutton, Washbrook, Gibb, Hammond, Yardley and Bedser) and the tourists were out for 310. Queensland batted for a declaration hitting 230/6 in 177 minutes, Ken Mackay sticking in for 33 not out while Len Johnson hit 75 at the other end. Needing 321 to win in 224 minutes the MCC went for a draw. Cyril Washbrook made 124 and helped by Edrich (71) in a stand of 162 for the second wicket this was done with few problems, though McCool (3/73) took three late wickets (Washbrook, Ikin and Compton) to leave them 238/6.

First Test – Brisbane

See Main Article - 1946–47 Ashes series

Queensland Country vs MCC

The team travelled 160 miles north after the disastrous First Test to play at Gympie. The Queensland Country XI Thomas Allen won the toss and batted. Allen himself top-scored with 53, with Len Johnson making 40 and Herbert Zischke 32. Peter Smith proved useful in another minor game and took 5/80 as the home side were dismissed for 208. The reserve openers Paul Gibb (31) and Laurie Fishlock (62) made an opening stand of 82, Joe Hardstaff stroked his way to 64 and the all rounder James Langridge 42. The local fast bowler Tim Ball took 5/69 and Len Johnson 3/51 as the MCC were out for 282, but the leg-breaks of Don Tallon's brother Bill were hit for 0/73. Back in to bat the Queensland XI made a solid 311/9 with James Cockburn (41), Tim Allen (40), Colin Stribe (75) and Keith Gartell (52 not out) seeing out the draw.

Second Test – Sydney

See Main Article - 1946–47 Ashes series

Northern New South Wales vs MCC

After losing their second Test by an innings the MCC went north to the industrial town of Newcastle for the first of four minor games before the Third Test at Melbourne. This one was against the combined grade sides of Northern New South Wales. Wally Hammond was captain, and struck 142 in the MCC's 395, with Laurie Fishlock making 110, Bill Edrich 59 not out and Len Hutton 42 with Hinman taking 5/92. Hinman opened the batting with 46, the top-score in their reply of 202 as Bill Voce took 4/45, with Dick Pollard (2/62), James Langridge (2/46) and even Len Hutton (2/4) helping out. The MCC batted again, but Pickles took 4/29 to dismiss Hutton (5), Washbrook (9), Fishlock (0) and Langridge (0), but Denis Compton made 75 not out and Hammond 30 not out coming in at number 8 as they finished on 146/6 in another draw.

Southern New South Wales vs MCC

The team travelled to the Australian Capital Territory for another two day game in Canberra against the combined grade teams of South New South Wales. Hammond captained again, won the toss and batted. Len Hutton and Cyril Washbrook made hay with 133 and 115 in an opening knock of 254, Hammond made 42 and Compton 76 as the MCC made 465/8 on the first day. The second day was ruined by rain, which was fortunate for Southern NSW as Hammond declared his overnight score and they collapsed to 11/4 to Dick Pollard's 4/2.

Victoria Country vs MCC

The MCC continued south into Victoria for another Country XI game, this time a one-day knockabout. The local team batted first and the off-spinner Peter Smith took another useful 6/43. Smith was ill during much of the tour and proved too slow in the air for first class cricket in Australia, so was used in the minor games to rest other players. Gibb (49) and Fishlock (41) opened again and Bill Edrich made 62 as they passed the Victorian Country XI total of 156 for a four wicket win, but carried on batting to 200/4, when Edrich was out, in order to gather some batting practice.

Third Test – Melbourne

See Main Article - 1946–47 Ashes series

Tasmania Combined XI vs MCC

Social successes are one of the causes of their cricket failure. They are not always going to bed early in the Tests. Some are known to have reached their hotels long after the Australians have been tucked up for the night. There are tourists who do not give the impression that cricket is their main consideration.
Clif Cary, Sunday Express
Like Western Australia Tasmania were a weak side and they were sent some help from the mainland to play the MCC and showcase the talents of some star players; Lindsay Hassett, Keith Miller and Ian Johnson of Victoria and Sid Barnes of New South Wales. Wally Hammond preferred to stay in Melbourne, which was seen as a slight to the state, while his overworked bowlers had to go. Major Howard replied that Hammond was badly in need of a rest and that Wright and Bedser were given to option of resting in Melbourne, but chose to go to Tasmania. When Hammond was unable to play in the Fifth Test it was thought that it was illness that kept him in Melbourne. Norman Yardley won the toss and batted, the MCC making 278 on the first day. Laurie Fishlock held the early innings together with 52 as they crashed to 53/4 with Bill Edrich (82), Alec Bedser (51) - his first first class 50 - and Godfrey Evans (34) hoisting up the lower order. They were asked to restrain themselves from hitting sixes due to the glass shortage, but the Tasmanian captain Ron Morrisby was not asked and the opener Ron Thomas twice lifted Dick Pollard over the ropes in his innings of 16 at the end of the day, though no windows were broken. Morrisby was also out for 16, but Barnes made 57, Hassett 35 and Miller 70 with the wicketkeeper Gardiner hitting 94 batting at number 9. Pollard was hit for 2/124 off 20 overs and the Combined XI hit 374 in 250 minutes. Coming in 96 runs behind on the first innings Fishlock (46) and Hardstaff (60) added 91 for the second wicket, then Denis Compton struck 124, his first innings of note since the start of the tour. Jack Ikin (50) helped him add 168 for the fourth wicket and Yardley declared on 353/9. The task of making 258 runs in under two hours was not seriously attempted, but Ian Johnson came in at number three and hit an unbeaten 80 out of 145/2. 18,700 attended the game with £2,718 in receipts.

Tasmania vs MCC

Some of the oldest grade clubs in Australia are in Tasmania, but it was a weak state side that would not fully complete in the Sheffield Shield for another 25 years. With the Australian Test players returning home the MCC ran up 361/3 on the first day after winning the toss. Hutton gave a sound start with 51, but Joe Hardstaff (155) and Denis Compton (163) stroked their way through a stand of 282. The second day was rain-affected and Yardley declared at 467/5 to give him the chance of dismissing Tasmania twice in a day. Bill Voce (2/7), Bill Edrich (4/26) and Jack Ikin (3/17) ran through their first innings and only Julian Murflett's 46 not out from number 9 brought them up from 49/8 to 103 all out. Following on Tasmania lost regular wickets to Compton (4/51), but ensured a draw with 129/6. 10,290 attended the game with £1,176 in receipts.

South Australia vs MCC

<blockquote>
For Hammond there was one highlight in a season of disasters...he became the seventh man in cricket history to register an aggregate of more than 50,000 runs in first-class games. Hammond reached his goal in his 992nd innings, and for some time afterwards he was kept busy answering congratulatory letters, telegrams, and cables from admirers in all parts of the world.
Clif Cary
</blockquote>
Wally Hammond rejoined the team at Adelaide for the return match against South Australia. He chose to bat on a slow pitch and the MCC batted into the third day for 577. Len Hutton led the way with 88, Laurie Fishlock made 57, but the highlight was the captain's 167th first class century of 188 which made him the seventh man to make 50,000 first class runs after W.G. Grace, Jack Hobbs, Phil Mead, Frank Woolley, Patsy Hendren and Herbert Sutcliffe. before these milestones even loyal England supporters had been calling for him to be dropped from the team because of his poor form, and to allow Norman Yardley to captain England. Hammond added 243 with James Langridge (100) and only Bruce Dooland returned respectable figures with 4/67 off 33.7 overs. Doug Wright (3/90) dismissed Reginald Craig and Don Bradman for 26/2, but South Australia responded well with 443, Paul Ridings making 77, Ron Hamance 145 and Ron James 85. Bill Voce bowled manfully for 4/125, but the surprise was Hardstaff who snapped up 3/24 with his medium-pacers on a wicket which started to break up late on the second day. With only two hours left Hutton put in some batting practice with 77 not out and Hardstaff 40 not out, but Washbrook was out for a duck. It was hoped that a similar wicket in the forthcoming Fourth Test would aid Wright, but the over-prepared Test pitch was "as dead as Mussolini" and it was thought that the MCC pitch had been neglected as a result. 34,068 attended the game with £2,950 in receipts.

Fourth Test – Adelaide

See Main Article - 1946–47 Ashes series

Victoria Country vs MCC

After the drawn Fourth Test Hammond took the MCC to the famous Victorian gold rush town Ballarat, which was at the start of a post-war boom. The Victorian Country XI batted first and made an impressive 268 even though only Douglas Brown (64) exceeded 40. Bill Voce took 3/28 and Peter Smith 3/70. The local fast bowler Robert McArthur (2/70) soon had Fishlock and Edrich out for ducks and the opener-wicketkeeper Paul Gibb had to fight back with 69. Plummer took 4/68 and the MCC only overtook the Country team by 20 runs thanks to Denis Compton (61) and Godfrey Evans (82). Hammond could not bat due to his fibrosis, which made him unfit for the Fifth Test. Dick Pollard (2/7) took two quick wickets and Smith (2/10) another couple, but the match was drawn with the local team 70/5 at the end of the second day.

Victoria vs MCC

He played the ball in the middle of the bat for an over or two. Then he commenced to make strokes. He glanced Pollard for four. He hooked Wright to the fence...All young Harvey's strokes were true. He placed his off and on drives past the fieldsmen...Jack Ryder, was deeply impressed. Trumper, Clem Hill, Macartney, Bradman, Jackson were in their teens when they played their first Test. Neil Harvey has excellent prospects of joining their company.
Clif Cary
With Hammond ill Norman Yardley led the team in the return match against Victoria. He won the toss and batted with the MCC making 355. Laurie Fishlock made 51, Denis Compton 93, Jack Ikin 71 and Godfrey Evans 41, with Keith Miller taking 4/63 and the slow left-arm wrist-spin of George Tribe going for 3/142. Victoria were in trouble at 32/3, but captain Lindsay Hassett (126) added 120 runs in 120 minutes with the 18-year-old Neil Harvey (69). Tribe made 60 coming in at number 9 and added 57 for the last wicket with the wicketkeeper Bill Baker to take Victoria to 327. Batting again the tourists floundered to Tribe whose 6/49 cleared them up for 118, leaving the home side 151 to win, but there was no time and the game ended with the MCC innings. 39,011 attended the game with £3,578 in receipts.

New South Wales vs MCC

In their penultimate match of the Australian tour the MCC returned to Sydney. Ginty Lush won the toss and batted. Keith Carmody (65) and Arthur Morris (44) made an opening partnership of 78, Sid Barnes also made 44, Eric Lukeman 70 and Ray Lindwall 45, but the most notable performance was by Peter Smith. Smith had suffered a hand injury en route to Australia, was in hospital for weeks with appendicitis and was considered too slow in the air and flat in trajectory to succeed on Australian wickets, but he took 9/121 by attacking the off stump, the best figures by an English bowler in Australia. New South Wales were out for 342, but had the MCC out for 266. Len Hutton had made 19 of 20 runs when he was caught on the chin by a bumper from Ginty Lush (0/20) and was taken to hospital, but returned at 172/7 and made 40. Denis Compton hit 75 while he was away and the NSW bowlers sharing the honours; Lindwall 2/54, Bill Johnston 3/51, Ernie Toshack 3/88 and John Pettiford 2/48. Leading by 76 runs NSW needed quicks runs and made 262/5 in 226 minutes. Morris struck 47, Lukeman 45 and Ronald Kissell 80 not out. Smith took 3/73 to bring his match total to 12/194. Asked to make 347 runs in just over two hours the MCC could only go for a draw and Hutton (72) and Compton (74 not out) took them to 203/3 without much trouble. 23,228 attended the game with £2,103 in receipts.

Fifth Test – Sydney

See Main Article - 1946–47 Ashes series

First Class Tour Averages
Source As was the convention of the time gentleman amateurs have their initials in front of their surname and professional players have their initials after their name, if used at all.p14 and p97, Fred Titmus, My Life in Cricket, John Blake Publishing Ltd, 2005 

References

Bibliography
 Ashley Brown, The Pictorial History of Cricket, Bison, 1988
 Clif Cary, Cricket Controversy, Test matches in Australia 1946-47, T. Werner Laurie Ltd, 1948
 Ray Lindwall, Flying Stumps, Marlin Books, 1954
 Keith Miller, Cricket Crossfire, Oldbourne Press, 1956
 A.G. Moyes, A Century of Cricketers, Angus and Robertson, 1950
 E.W. Swanton, Swanton in Australia with MCC 1946–1975, Fontana/Collins, 1975
 Bob Willis and Patrick Murphy, Starting with Grace, A Pictorial Celebration of Cricket 1864-1986, Stanley Paul, 1986References using Cricinfo or Wisden may require free registration for access.Further reading
 John Arlott, John Arlott's 100 Greatest Batsmen, MacDonald Queen Anne Press, 1986
 Peter Arnold, The Illustrated Encyclopedia of World Cricket, W. H. Smith, 1985
 Bill Frindall, The Wisden Book of Test Cricket 1877-1978, Wisden, 1979
 Tom Graveney and Norman Miller, The Ten Greatest Test Teams  Sidgewick and Jackson, 1988
 Chris Harte, A History of Australian Cricket, Andre Deutsch, 1993
 Alan Hill, The Bedsers: Twinning Triumphs, Mainstream Publishing, 2002
 Ray Robinson, On Top Down Under, Cassell, 1975
 E.W. Swanton (ed), Barclay's World of Cricket'', Willow, 1986

External links
 CricketArchive tour itinerary 

1946 in Australian cricket
1946 in English cricket
1947 in Australian cricket
1947 in English cricket
Australian cricket seasons from 1945–46 to 1969–70
English cricket tours of Australia
International cricket competitions from 1945–46 to 1960
Australia 1946-47